Roxanne Bouchard (born 1972) is a Canadian writer and educator from Quebec. She is best known for her series of maritime crime fiction novels following the investigations of detective Joaquin Moralès in the Gaspé Peninsula of Quebec.

Early life and education 
Born in Saint-Jérôme, Quebec in 1972, Roxanne Bouchard studied at the University of Montreal and then obtained a master's degree from Université du Québec à Montréal (UQAM). She has taught literature at the Joliette campus of the Cégep régional de Lanaudière starting in 1994, when she was completing her master's degree at UQAM.

Literary career 
Bouchard's first novel, Whisky et paraboles, was published in 2005. The novel won that year's Prix Robert-Cliche, awarded for a French-language novel of a Canadian author who had not published a novel before, as well as the 2007 , and it was a finalist for the Prix Anne-Hébert, an award for the first French-language novel by a Quebecoise writer.

In 2013, Bouchard published En terrain miné, which covers her five-year exchange of letters with a soldier in Afghanistan, corporal Patrick Kègle. 5 balles dans la tête, published in 2017, contains the recollections of wartime experiences of 25 active or retired members of the Canadian Armed Forces, mostly those who participated in the War in Afghanistan. In writing 5 balles dans la tête, she met with soldiers at CFB Valcartier and had them talk about their experiences, rather than ask them questions. At one point in the research process, in 2013, the memories became so overwhelming that bad dreams prevented her from sleeping and led her to pause her work until January 2014.

Detective Moralès series 
Bouchard is best known for her series of maritime crime novels following the investigations of detective Joaquin Moralès in the Gaspé Peninsula of Quebec. In the first novel of the series, titled Nous étions le sel de la mer (2014), Moralès investigates a body washed up from the sea. The novel was a 2015 Prix France-Québec finalist. The novel won the 2021 Best French Crime Book award from the Crime Writers of Canada and topped the online sales chart of the Académie des lettres du Québec in August 2020. The third novel of the series, Le murmure des hakapiks, was published in 2021. Two parallel and converging storylines make up the novel, one in which Moralès is investigating the assault of a teenager, while her friend Simone Lord, a Fisheries Officer introduced in the previous novel, monitors a seal hunt aboard a trawler. The novel was nominated for the Crime Writers of Canada award for Best French Crime Book in 2022.

English versions of the original French-language novelsWe Were the Salt of the Sea (2018), The Coral Bride (2020), and Whisper of the Seals (2022)were translated by David Warriner and published by British publisher Orenda Books. In 2020, Swiss publisher  obtained rights for a German-language version of the first two novels. The Coral Bride was longlisted for the 2021 CWA Dagger for Crime Fiction in Translation from the United Kingdom-based Crime Writers' Association.

Bibliography

Novels 
  Reissued in 2008.

Detective Moralès series 
 
 English edition: Warriner, David. We Were the Salt of the Sea, Orenda Books, 2018.
  
 English edition: Warriner, David. The Coral Bride, Orenda Books, 2020.
 
 English edition: Warriner, David. Whisper of the Seals, Orenda Books, 2022.

References

21st-century Canadian women writers
21st-century Canadian novelists
Canadian women novelists
1972 births
Living people
Université du Québec à Montréal alumni
Canadian crime fiction writers
Detective fiction writers
Writers from Quebec
People from Saint-Jérôme